The 46th (North Midland) Division was an infantry division of the British Army, part of the Territorial Force, that saw service in the First World War. At the outbreak of the war, the 46th Division was commanded by Major-General Hon. E.J. Montagu-Stuart-Wortley. Originally called the North Midland Division, it was redesignated as the 46th Division in May 1915.

Formation
The Territorial Force (TF) was formed on 1 April 1908 following the enactment of the Territorial and Reserve Forces Act 1907 (7 Edw.7, c.9) which combined and re-organised the old Volunteer Force, the Honourable Artillery Company and the Yeomanry.  On formation, the TF contained 14 infantry divisions and 14 mounted yeomanry brigades.  One of the divisions was the North Midland Division.

The North Midland Division was created by combining two existing Volunteer Infantry brigades, the Staffordshire Brigade and the North Midland Brigade. The Staffordshire Brigade was composed of battalions of the South Staffordshire Regiment and the Prince of Wales's (North Staffordshire Regiment). The North Midland Brigade was split into two, one, the Lincoln and Leicester Brigade, composed of battalions of the Lincolnshire and Leicestershire Regiments, the other, the Nottinghamshire and Derbyshire Brigade, comprising the four TF battalions of the Nottinghamshire and Derbyshire Regiment (later the Sherwood Foresters). In peacetime, the divisional headquarters was in Lichfield.

History
The North Midland Division was sent to France in February 1915 and served on the Western Front for the duration of the First World War. On 12 May 1915 the division was numbered 46th (North Midland) Division and the brigades were also numbered. During the Battle of Loos the 46th Division was decimated in an attack on the Hohenzollern Redoubt on 13 October 1915.

It was later involved in the Battle of the Somme in July 1916, where in the opening phase as part of VII Corps, the southernmost corps of the British Third Army, the Division took part in the diversionary attack at Gommecourt on the first day on the Somme, 1 July 1916, which was a catastrophic failure resulting in heavy losses.

The event dogged the division afterwards with a poor reputation until 29 September 1918, during the Hundred Days Offensive, when it re-established its name at the Battle of St. Quentin Canal where, utilising life-belts and collapsible boats, it crossed the formidable obstacle of the canal and used scaling ladders to surmount the steep gradient of the opposite bank and captured multiple fortified machine-gun posts.

Order of battle

During the war, the composition of the division was as follows:

 137th (Staffordshire) Brigade
 1/5th Battalion, South Staffordshire Regiment
 1/6th Battalion, South Staffordshire Regiment
 1/5th Battalion, Prince of Wales's (North Staffordshire Regiment) (disbanded January 1918)
 1/6th Battalion, Prince of Wales's (North Staffordshire Regiment)
 4th Battalion, King's Regiment (Liverpool) (from November to December 1915)
 1/4th Battalion, Seaforth Highlanders (joined and left November 1915)
 1/4th (City of London) Battalion, London Regiment (Royal Fusiliers) (joined and left November 1915)
 137th Machine Gun Company, Machine Gun Corps (formed 7 March 1916, moved to 46th Battalion, Machine Gun Corps 28 February 1918)
 137th Trench Mortar Battery (formed 2 March 1916)

 138th (Lincoln and Leicester) Brigade
 1/4th Battalion, Lincolnshire Regiment (left January 1918)
 1/5th Battalion, Lincolnshire Regiment
 1/4th Battalion, Leicestershire Regiment
 1/5th Battalion, Leicestershire Regiment
 138th Machine Gun Company, Machine Gun Corps (formed 22 February 1916, moved to 46th Battalion, Machine Gun Corps 28 February 1918)
 138th Trench Mortar Battery (formed 2 March 1916)

 139th (Sherwood Foresters) Brigade
 1/5th Battalion, Sherwood Foresters
 1/6th Battalion, Sherwood Foresters
 1/7th Battalion, Sherwood Foresters (disbanded January 1918)
 1/8th Battalion, Sherwood Foresters
 1/4th Battalion, Black Watch (Royal Highland Regiment) (joined and left November 1915)
 1/3rd (City of London) Battalion, London Regiment (Royal Fusiliers) (joined and left November 1915)
 139th Machine Gun Company, Machine Gun Corps (formed 16 February 1916, moved to 46th Battalion, Machine Gun Corps 26 February 1918)
 139th Trench Mortar Battery (formed 9 March 1916)

Mounted Troops
 B Squadron, 1/1st Yorkshire Hussars (joined at Luton, left 5 May 1916)
 North Midland Cyclist Company, Army Cyclist Corps (formed 11 November 1914, left 9 May 1916)

 Artillery 
 I North Midland Brigade, RFA (1st, 2nd, and 3rd Lincolnshire Batteries, and I North Midland Brigade Ammunition Column) (numbered CCXXX Bde on 13 May 1916)
 II North Midland Brigade, RFA (1st, 2nd, and 3rd Staffordshire Batteries, and II North Midland Brigade Ammunition Column) (numbered CCXXXI Bde on 13 May 1916)
 III North Midland Brigade, RFA (4th, 5th, and 6th Staffordshire Batteries, and III North Midland Brigade Ammunition Column) (numbered CCXXXII Bde on 13 May 1916; left 3 January 1917)
 IV North Midland (Howitzer) Brigade, RFA (1st and 2nd Derbyshire Batteries, and IV North Midland (H) Brigade Ammunition Column) (numbered CCXXXIII Bde on 13 May 1916; broken up 29 August 1916)
 North Midland (Staffordshire) Heavy Battery, Royal Garrison Artillery (until 18 April 1915)
 46th Divisional Trench Mortar Brigade, RFA
 V.46 Heavy Trench Mortar Battery (joined 20 June 1916; absorbed partly by X and Y and partly by I Corps HTM Bty on 3 February 1918)
 X.46 Medium Trench Mortar Battery (joined 9 March 1916)
 Y.46 Medium Trench Mortar Battery (formed 17 March 1916)
 Z.46 Medium Trench Mortar Battery (formed 17 March 1916; absorbed by X and Y on 3 February 1918)
 North Midland Divisional Ammunition Column, RFA (formed before embarkation, later numbered 46th; absorbed brigade ammunition columns 22 May 1916)

Engineers
 North Midland Divisional Engineers (later numbered 46th)
 1/1st North Midland Field Company, Royal Engineers (served with 28th Division from 26 December 1914 to 6 April 1915; later numbered 465th Field Company)
 1/2nd North Midland Field Company, RE (later numbered 466th Field Company)
 57th Field Company, RE (joined from 3rd Division 7 April, left 10 July 1915)
 2/1st North Midland Field Company, RE (joined 10 July 1915, later numbered 468th Field Company)
 North Midland Signal Company, RE (later numbered 46th Signal Company)

 Pioneers 
 1/1st Battalion, Monmouthshire Regiment

Machine Guns
 46th Battalion, Machine Gun Corps (formed on 28 February 1918)
 137th Company, MGC (moved from 137th Brigade)
 138th Company, MGC (moved from 138th Brigade)
 139th Company, MGC (moved from 139th Brigade)
 178th Company, MGC (joined on 28 March 1917)

Medical Services
 1st North Midland Field Ambulance, Royal Army Medical Corps
 2nd North Midland Field Ambulance, RAMC
 3rd North Midland Field Ambulance, RAMC
 17th Sanitary Section (joined 4 March 1915; left 21 March 1917)
 North Midland Divisional Ambulance Workshop, Army Service Corps (joined 4 March 1915, later numbered 46th, moved to Divisional Train 6 April 1916)
 1st North Midland Mobile Veterinary Section, Army Veterinary Corps

Transport
 North Midland Divisional Train, ASC (later numbered 46th)
 451st Horse Transport Company, ASC
 452nd HT Company, ASC
 453rd HT Company, ASC
 454th HT Company, ASC

Labour
 240th Divisional Employment Company, Labour Corps (formed 25 June 1917)

Memorials

Postwar
The Territorial Force was disbanded after the war. It was reformed as the Territorial Army in 1920 as was the 46th Division. However, the 46th Division was disbanded in 1936, the headquarters was converted into 2nd Anti-Aircraft Division and several of its infantry battalions into AA units. Most of the remainder of 46th Division's units were sent to other divisions, mainly the 49th (West Riding).

Commanders
The following officers commanded the division at various times:

Victoria Cross recipients
 Lance Corporal William Coltman, 1/6th Battalion, North Staffordshire Regiment
 Lieutenant John Barrett, 1/5th Battalion, Leicestershire Regiment
 Captain John Green Royal Army Medical Corps, attached 1/5th Battalion, Sherwood Foresters
 Sergeant William Johnson, 1/5th Battalion, Sherwood Foresters
 Lieutenant Colonel Bernard Vann, 1/6th Battalion, Sherwood Foresters
 Captain Geoffrey Vickers, 1/7th (Robin Hood) Battalion, Sherwood Foresters

See also

 List of British divisions in World War I

References

Bibliography
 Maj A.F. Becke,History of the Great War: Order of Battle of Divisions, Part 2a: The Territorial Force Mounted Divisions and the 1st-Line Territorial Force Divisions (42–56), London: HM Stationery Office, 1935/Uckfield: Naval & Military Press, 2007, .
 
 Alan MacDonald, A Lack of Offensive Spirit? The 46th (North Midland) Division at Gommecourt, 1st July 1916, West Wickham: Iona Books, 2008, .
/Uckfield: Naval & Military Press, 2002, .

External links
The British Army in the Great War (The Long, Long Trail)
 British Military History

Infantry divisions of the British Army in World War I
Military units and formations established in 1908
1908 establishments in the United Kingdom